is a district located in Kyoto Prefecture, Japan.

, the district has an estimated population of 27,829 and a population density of 165 persons per square kilometer. The total area is 169.02 km2.

Towns and villages 
Ine
Yosano

Mergers 
On March 1, 2006 the towns of Kaya, Iwataki and Nodagawa merged to form the new town of Yosano.

References 

Districts in Kyoto Prefecture